The nominations for the 19th Vancouver Film Critics Circle Awards, honoring the best in filmmaking in 2018, were announced on December 12, 2018. The Favourite led with six nominations.

The winners were announced on December 17, 2018. Roma won two awards, including Best Film, while First Reformed secured the most wins with three, including Best Director and Actor.

Winners and nominees

International

Best Film
  Roma
 The Favourite
 First Reformed

Best Director
  Paul Schrader – First Reformed
 Alfonso Cuarón – Roma
 Yorgos Lanthimos - The Favourite

Best Actor
  Ethan Hawke – First Reformed
 Christian Bale – Vice
 Viggo Mortensen – Green Book

Best Actress
  Olivia Colman – The Favourite (TIE)
  Regina Hall – Support the Girls (TIE)
  Melissa McCarthy – Can You Ever Forgive Me? (TIE)

Best Supporting Actor
  Richard E. Grant – Can You Ever Forgive Me?
 Mahershala Ali – Green Book
 Peter Bogdanovich – The Other Side of the Wind
 Steven Yeun – Burning

Best Supporting Actress
  Rachel Weisz – The Favourite
 Claire Foy – First Man
 Emma Stone – The Favourite

Best Screenplay
  Paul Schrader – First Reformed
 Bo Burnham – Eighth Grade
 Deborah Davis and Tony McNamara – The Favourite

Best Foreign-Language Film
  Roma
 Burning
 Shoplifters

Best Documentary
  Minding the Gap
 Free Solo
 Won't You Be My Neighbor?

Canadian

Best Canadian Film
  Edge of the Knife
 Fausto
 Roads in February (Les routes en février)

Best Director of a Canadian Film
  Gwaai Edenshaw and Helen Haig-Brown – Edge of the Knife
 Andrea Bussmann – Fausto
 Katherine Jerkovic – Roads in February (Les routes en février)
 Philippe Lesage – Genesis (Genèse)

Best Actor in a Canadian Film
  Tyler York – Edge of the Knife
 Théodore Pellerin – Genesis (Genèse)
 Josh Wiggins – Giant Little Ones

Best Actress in a Canadian Film
  Arlen Aguayo-Stewart – Roads in February (Les routes en février)
 Troian Bellisario – Clara
 Jennifer Hardy CK – Spice It Up
 Michaela Kurimsky – Firecrackers

Best Supporting Actor in a Canadian Film
  Aaron Read – When the Storm Fades
 Pierre-Luc Brillant – The Fireflies Are Gone (La disparition des lucioles)
 William Russ – Edge of the Knife

Best Supporting Actress in a Canadian Film
  Kayla Lorette – When the Storm Fades
 Gloria Demassi – Roads in February (Les routes en février)
 Gabrielle Rose – Kingsway

Best Screenplay for a Canadian Film
  Keith Behrman – Giant Little Ones
 Zebulon Zang – N.O.N.
 Katherine Jerkovic – Roads in February (Les routes en février)

Best Canadian Documentary
  Anthropocene: The Human Epoch
 The Museum of Forgotten Triumphs
 What Is Democracy?

One to Watch
  Katherine Jerkovic – Roads in February (Les routes en février)
 Akash Sherman – Clara
 Jasmin Mozaffari – Firecrackers
 Drew Lint – M/M

Best British Columbia Film
  Edge of the Knife
 N.O.N.
 This Mountain Life
 When the Storm Fades

References

External links
 

2018
2018 film awards
2018 in Canadian cinema
2018 in British Columbia